Arnulfo Torrevillas (born 15 August 1939) is a Filipino boxer. He competed in the men's bantamweight event at the 1964 Summer Olympics. At the 1964 Summer Olympics, he defeated Börje Karvonen of Finland, before losing to Fermin Espinosa of Cuba.

References

1939 births
Living people
Filipino male boxers
Olympic boxers of the Philippines
Boxers at the 1964 Summer Olympics
Place of birth missing (living people)
Bantamweight boxers